The Dilessi murders were committed between 4 and 7 April 1870, when one Italian and three English aristocrats were murdered at Dilesi, a coastal town in eastern Boeotia, by Greek brigands while touring the area near Marathon. The events triggered a crisis between Greece and Great Britain.

Further reading 
 Contemporary report on the incident by Ioannes Gennadius, founder of the Gennadius Library.
 First modern monograph on the subject by Romilly James Heald Jenkins.

References 

1870 in Greece
April 1870 events
Greece–United Kingdom relations
History of Greece (1863–1909)
Marathon, Greece
1870 in international relations
Greece–Italy relations
Murder in Greece
1870 murders in Greece
Italian people murdered abroad
English people murdered abroad